Tukayevo (Tuqay) is a rural locality (a village) in Badrakovsky Selsoviet, Burayevsky District, Bashkortostan, Russia. The population was 101 as of 2010. There is 1 street.

Geography 
Tukayevo is located 25 km southwest of Burayevo (the district's administrative centre) by road. Bolshebadrakovo is the nearest rural locality.

References 

Rural localities in Burayevsky District